John McAdam (March 28, 1807, Ireland – March 15, 1893) was a politician and businessman in New Brunswick, Canada.

Born near Belfast, McAdam became a lumber merchant in Milltown, New Brunswick. He married a Miss Murchie.

He was elected to the Legislative Assembly of New Brunswick in 1854 as a Liberal-Conservative to represent the electoral district of Charlotte until 1872 when he was elected to the House of Commons of Canada in the riding of Charlotte and defeated there in 1874 and 1878. He was re-elected to the New Brunswick legislature in 1882 until 1886.

During his time in New Brunswick politics, he was a Member of the Executive Council between September 1867 and October 1, 1870. He was Commissioner of Public Works between 1867 and 1868 and he served as President of the Executive Council between 1868 and 1870.

McAdam had numerous land grants in the Canterbury Parish and Dumfries Parish, and left his name there to McAdam Junction, a railway town that sprang up because of the lumber trade.

References 

Conservative Party of Canada (1867–1942) MPs
Irish emigrants to Canada
Members of the House of Commons of Canada from New Brunswick
Members of the Executive Council of New Brunswick
Progressive Conservative Party of New Brunswick MLAs
1807 births
1893 deaths
Place of birth missing
People from County Armagh
People from County Antrim